Located in Tennessee, Alabama, and Georgia, Champy's Famous Fried Chicken is a chain of Southern-style fried chicken restaurants. Champy's owners, Seth and Crissy Champion, created the menu using their family recipes from the Mississippi Delta region. The restaurant's motto is "Blues, Brews, and Bird".

Fare 
The menu features shrimp and farm-raised catfish. The menu selection varies by location and is determined by the popularity of dishes at each location. Champy's menu includes appetizers, salads, snacks, plates, and meals.

Reviews 

A review in The Chatter, a Chattanooga, Tennessee magazine, claimed that Champy's offers great food and has customers “lining up for it."

Garden & Gun stated that Champy's fried chicken is authentic to the Mississippi Delta region, adding a note on how it is "hand-breaded, with just enough grease and a hint of peppery hotness, it’s fried gold."

A writer for another local paper, the Nooga, said the service and atmosphere of the restaurant are impressive, and the flavor of the food is sensational. However, he claimed to be disappointed by the dining experience, judging the experience to be “subpar at best, and the melted Styrofoam left a bad taste in my mouth.”

Locations 
After Champy's initial success in Chattanooga, the owners expanded the chain to several locations in Alabama. Their first Alabama location was in Muscle Shoals, Alabama, followed by locations in Daphne, Alabama, and Alabaster, Alabama.

References

External links 
 

Fast-food poultry restaurants
Restaurants in Tennessee
Restaurants in Alabama
Companies based in Chattanooga, Tennessee